Russell Wayne George Tucker (born 11 April 1990) is a South African athlete specialising in the discus throw. He won several medals on continental level including the gold at the 2015 African Games as well as Gold Medal in 2016 African games and silver at the 2014 African Championships.

His personal best in the event is 64.24 metres set in Pretoria in 2016.

Due to Injury, Russell Tucker Retired from Discus in May 2016.

Competition record

Progression
2012 – 58.84
2013 – 59.27
2014 – 62.15
2015 – 62.74
2016 - 64.24

References

1990 births
Living people
People from Barberton, Mpumalanga
South African male discus throwers
Athletes (track and field) at the 2015 African Games
African Games gold medalists for South Africa
African Games medalists in athletics (track and field)